James Ferguson Cumming (22 April 1886 – 8 December 1964) was a Scottish professional footballer who played as an outside right in the Football League for Manchester City and West Ham United. He also played in the Scottish League for Aberdeen and Dumbarton.

Personal life 
In December 1915, late in the second year of the First World War, Cumming attested in the British Army and was transferred to the Army Reserve. He was mobilised in April 1916 and transferred to the Gordon Highlanders. Cumming was transferred to the Royal Engineers in December 1916 and was serving as a sapper when he suffered a gunshot wound to the left foot in June 1917. He was wounded again in June 1918 and was discharged in February 1919.

Career statistics

References

1886 births
Scottish footballers
Dumbarton F.C. players
Aberdeen F.C. players
Manchester City F.C. players
West Ham United F.C. players
Scottish Football League players
English Football League players
Association football outside forwards
Clydebank Juniors F.C. players
Benburb F.C. players
Maryhill F.C. players
British Army personnel of World War I
Gordon Highlanders soldiers
Royal Engineers soldiers
1964 deaths
Place of death missing
British shooting survivors